Serra da Estrela Natural Park is situated in the largest mountain range in Portugal - the Serra da Estrela, and is the source of the rivers Mondego, Zêzere (tributary of the Tagus), and Alva.  The park is the largest natural conservation area in Portugal and occupies about 1,000 km².  More than half of its area is located above an altitude of 700 m. At 1,993 m it contains the highest peak in Continental Portugal (named Torre) and a ski resort (named Vodafone Ski Resort).

During the Quaternary period, the entre region was subjected to the action of ice and once this disappeared visible marks were left on the landscape. Valleys in the shape of horseshoes, ravines, polished rocks and lakes of glacial origin are just some of the formations that demonstrate the importance of the ice and snow in modelling the mountains.

Geography

The central plateau, dominated by the 7 m Torre (Tower) and Cântaros, location of the glacial valley of the Zêzere, contrasts with another mountain, the Videmonte plateau, which is still in the initial bed of the Mondego, dotted with isolated farms among fields of rye and pastures where cattle are bred. In the valleys to the south west, decorated by terraces and surrounded by the Penha dos Abutres, are the villages of Loriga and Alvoco, which have developed on powerful rocky spurs. Finally, the north west slope stretches from below Seia to the land dominated by the castle of Linhares and the fields where maize is cultivated and vines are planted up the slopes to where the broom grows.

Fauna

In terms of fauna, the presence of the bear is a thing of the past and even wolves only roam here sporadically. In addition to the wall lizard that is a feature of the region, other species include otters, genets, badgers, wild cats, water moles, red breasted bullfinches, Algerian wall lizards and midwife frogs.

Flora
The natural vegetation appears in three separate sectors. Under 900 m, in very clearly defined areas. Between 800/900 m and 1600 m is the domain of the black oak. From 1600 m upwards, we find the juniper and the high pastures where the gentian, a plant in danger of extinction, can be found.

Human occupation

The villages in the Serra da Estrela Natural Park area are mainly at the bottom of the mountains and date back to medieval times. However, before this other cultures left their mark on this area. One of the most notable examples of the Roman presence are the remains at Famalicão and Folgosinho, of the road that connected Mérida to Braga. The route by which it crosses the mountain would certainly have caused difficulties in construction. The Arab influence is seen in the irrigation system and the fruit orchards while the Visigothic culture organized all rural space by applying the Visigoth Code.

Economy
Throughout the Natural Park, a traditional mountain economy is practised, centred on agriculture, shepherding of sheep and goats, particularly domestic sheep and the manufacture of Serra da Estrela cheese. The craftsmanship of the region is expressed in basket work using chestnut and wicker, weaving, embroidered cotton and smoked produce.

Gallery

References

External links

 Official Site at the (Portuguese) Institute for Nature Conservation (Portuguese language)
 Serra da Estrela Natural Park information from the Cultural Landscapes and Cultural Landscape Ecosystems in Europe cultbase
 Serra da Estrela Natural Park Photos

Nature conservation in Portugal
Nature parks in Portugal
Ramsar sites in Portugal
Serra da Estrela
Tourist attractions in Guarda District